Mount Chiang is a distinctive mountain,  high, having the appearance of a gablelike projection from the north part of Chaplains Tableland, Royal Society Range, in Victoria Land, Antarctica. It was named by the Advisory Committee on Antarctic Names in 1992 after Erick Chiang, Manager, Polar Operations Section, Division of Polar Programs, National Science Foundation, from 1991.

References
 

Mountains of Victoria Land
Scott Coast